Al-Nasr CSC is an Emirati professional football club based in Al Nasr, Dubai and competes in the UAE Pro League. Al-Nasr, literally translating to "victory" in Arabic, was founded in 1945 and is considered as the first and oldest club in the United Arab Emirates.

History

Pre–UAE League era (1945–1973)
Al Nasr Sports Club was founded by a group of young men in a Al Ghubaiba, Dubai in 1945, making it the oldest club in UAE footballing history. The team played in an empty playground near a highschool for three years until in 1948 were they finally decided to establish modern rules of football. In 1951, Sheikh Rashid bin Saeed Al Maktoum chose the headquarters to be in a cafe close to a fish market, the cafe had a room for rent so the club would rent the room for meetings, gatherings and studying. The club would later move their headquarters to Shindagha. During this period the club went on with the name Al Ahli until in the 1960s where the players traveled to Qatar to face Al Ahli and lose, after their loss in Qatar, the players proposed to change the name to Al Nasr which would later become official. The club decided to move their headquarters to a larger house in Shindagha and invited Sheikh Zayed bin Sultan Al Nahyan to meet the club in their new headquarters, Sheikh Zayed decided to donate 60,000 AED as a gift to the club, they would use the money to develop the club.

Rise of competition (1973–1990)
In 1973, the UAE Pro-League was established and neighboring teams emerged forcing Al Nasr to start building a proper venue, so the construction of Al Maktoum Stadium began, however the team would join the league in 1974 so the club played their home games in Rashid Stadium until the completion of Al Makhtoum stadium in 1980, the club would win 3 UAE league, 3 presidents cup titles and a UAE federation cups during this time. The club would also be noted for hosting games with big clubs like Arsenal, Liverpool and Santos.

Modern era (1990–present)

After the end of the eighties, the club has yet to win the league but won notable cup competitions such as the president's cup, league cup and the GCC Champions League, around 2018 the team would renovate the Al Makhtoum Stadium for the 2019 AFC Asian Cup and host another friendly with Arsenal in 2019. Al Nasr removed coach Caio Zanardi and replaced him with former Dinamo Zagreb player and national Croatian player Krunoslav Jurčić, but he left Al Nasr in February 2021 after mediocre results in the league, and Jurcic was replaced with former River Plate coach Ramón Díaz.

Rivalries
The team has a big rivalry with Al Wasl, often called the Bur Dubai Derby or just simply Dubai Derby, both teams have competed to see which club is the best team in Bur Dubai area. It also has a rivalry with Shabab Al Ahli which is also based in the same city but not in the same area.

Honours
17 Official Championships.

Domestic competitions
Arabian Gulf League
Winners (3): 1977–78, 1978–79, 1985–86
Runners-up (4): 1980–81, 1984–85, 1999–2000, 2011–12

UAE President's Cup
Winners (4): 1984–85, 1985–86, 1988–89, 2014–15
Runners-up (7): 1974–75, 1979–80, 1983–84, 1991–92, 1996–97, 2016–17, 2020–21

UAE Federation Cup
Winners (3): 1988–87, 1999–00, 2001–02

UAE League Cup
Winners (2): 2015, 2020

Arabian Gulf Super Cup
Winners (2): 1990, 1996
Runners-up (1): 2015

Joint League Cup
Winners (1): 1984–85

ADNOC Championship Cup
Winners (1): 1993

Regional competitions
GCC Champions League 
Winners (1):  2014

Performance in AFC competitions

 AFC Champions League: 4 appearances
2012: Group Stage 
2013: Group Stage 
2016: Quarter-finals 
2019: Play off Round

 Asian Club Championship: 2 appearances
1987: Group Stage
1998: Withdrew (first round)

 Asian Cup Winners Cup: 1 appearance
1993–94: Withdrew

Staff

Board of Directors

Current squad

As of UAE Pro-League:

Unregistered players

Out on loan

Notable players

Past managers

Pro-League Record

Notes 2019–20 UAE football season was cancelled due to the COVID-19 pandemic in the United Arab Emirates.

Key
 Pos. = Position
 Tms. = Number of teams
 Lvl. = League

Other sports
Al-Nasr also fields teams in futsal, volleyball, handball, basketball, table tennis, swimming, cycling, athletics, karate, and jujutsu.

References

External links

Official Website in English

 
Football clubs in Dubai
Football clubs in the United Arab Emirates
Association football clubs established in 1945
1945 establishments in the Trucial States